This is a list of places on the Victorian Heritage Register in the Shire of Yarriambiack in Victoria, Australia. The Victorian Heritage Register is maintained by the Heritage Council of Victoria.

The Victorian Heritage Register, as of 2020, lists the following 13 state-registered places within the Shire of Yarriambiack:

References

Yarriamblack
Shire of Yarriambiack